The White Mountain National Forest (WMNF) is a federally managed forest contained within the White Mountains in the northeastern United States. It was established in 1918 as a result of the Weeks Act of 1911; federal acquisition of land had already begun in 1914. Most of the WMNF is in New Hampshire; a small part (about 5.65% of the forest) is in the neighboring state of Maine. 

While often casually referred to as a park, this is a national forest, used not only for hiking, camping, and skiing but for logging and other limited commercial purposes. The WMNF is the only national forest located in either New Hampshire or Maine, and is the most eastern national forest in the United States. Most of the major peaks over 4,000 feet high for peak-bagging in New Hampshire are located in the national forest. Over  of the Appalachian Trail traverses the White Mountain National Forest. In descending order of land area the forest lies in parts of Grafton, Coos, and Carroll counties in New Hampshire, and Oxford County in Maine.

The Forest Supervisor's office is located in Campton and there are three ranger districts: the Pemigewasset District, with offices in Campton; the Androscoggin District, based in Gorham; and the Saco District, based in Conway. Furthermore, there are several visitor centers, including those located at Lincoln, Campton (off Interstate 93), and Lincoln Woods (on the Kancamagus Highway). 

The White Mountain National Forest consists of three discontinuous areas, separated by two highways: I-93 and US 2. I-93 travels along Franconia Notch (a narrow north–south valley primarily within a state park), and west of the freeway includes Cannon Mountain, Kinsman Mountain and Mount Moosilauke (though the majority of Moosilauke is privately owned). East of I-93 is the largest section of the Forest, including the Presidential Range and many other ranges - most notably, the Franconia, Twin, Bond, Sandwich, Willey, and Carter-Moriah ranges. North of U.S. Route 2 is the smallest section of the National Forest, covering the Pilot Range and Mount Cabot.  Additionally, several other U.S. and NH State highways cross the forest, including US 3, US 302, NH 16 (White Mountain Highway), NH 112 (Kancamagus Highway), and NH 118 (Sawyer Highway).

It is home to wildlife species including bald eagle, raccoon, beaver, white-tailed deer, moose, black bear, coyote, peregrine falcon, Canadian lynx, river otter, bobcat, gray and red foxes, fisher, mink and porcupine.

Six designated Federal Wilderness Areas exist within the Forest: the  Presidential Range/Dry River Wilderness, the  Great Gulf Wilderness, the  Pemigewasset Wilderness, the  Sandwich Range Wilderness, the  Caribou/Speckled Mountain Wilderness, and the  Wild River Wilderness. These areas are protected from logging and commercial industries and are used solely for recreational and scientific purposes. They were formed under the Federal Wilderness Protection Act of 1984, and its amendments. The New England Wilderness Protection Act of 2006 increased the Sandwich Range Wilderness to its present size and created the Wild River Wilderness area.

Because of its beauty, its proximity to major metropolitan areas, its  of hiking trails, 23 campgrounds, and the presence of many ski areas within or near its boundaries, the WMNF is one of the most visited outdoor recreation sites east of the Mississippi.   Winter season lengths are projected to decline across the WMNF due to the effects of global warming, however, which is likely to continue the historic contraction and consolidation of the ski industry and threaten individual ski businesses and communities that rely on ski tourism.

Weather
US Forest Service signs on hiking trails at tree line state that the mountain summit areas have "the worst weather in America". Since 1849 at least 169 people have died on Mount Washington and the Presidential Range.

Image gallery

See also

 New England–Acadian forests
 John W. Weeks, sponsor of the Weeks Act

References

External links

Official website
SectionHiker's Backpacking Blog, detailed personal website
NE Wilderness Act press release

 
Forests of Maine
National Forests of New Hampshire
White Mountains (New Hampshire)
Protected areas of Oxford County, Maine
Protected areas of Coös County, New Hampshire
Protected areas of Grafton County, New Hampshire
Protected areas of Carroll County, New Hampshire
National Forests of the Appalachians
Protected areas established in 1918
1918 establishments in Maine
1918 establishments in New Hampshire